Gregory Mairs (born 7 December 1994) is an English badminton player. He started playing badminton at the age of six in Weaverham Leisure Centre.

Achievements

BWF International Challenge/Series (7 titles, 6 runners-up) 
Men's doubles

Mixed doubles

  BWF International Challenge tournament
  BWF International Series tournament
  BWF Future Series tournament

References

External links 
 

1994 births
Living people
Sportspeople from Manchester
English male badminton players